Joseph C. Manmiller (November 28, 1925 – October 13, 2008) was a Republican member of the Pennsylvania House of Representatives from 1975 to 1988.  He represented the 105th District

References

1925 births
2008 deaths
Republican Party members of the Pennsylvania House of Representatives
20th-century American politicians